Lepraria is a genus of leprose crustose lichens that grows on its substrate like patches of granular, caked up, mealy dust grains. Members of the genus are commonly called dust lichens. The main vegetative body (thallus) is made of patches of soredia (little balls of algae wrapped in fungus). There are no known mechanisms for sexual reproduction, yet members of the genus continue to speciate. Some species can form marginal lobes and appear squamulose. Because of the morphological simplicity of the thallus and the absence of sexual structures, the composition of lichen products (i.e., secondary metabolites made by lichens) are important characters to distinguish between similar species in Lepraria.

Taxonomy
Lepraria was circumscribed in 1803 by Swedish lichenologist Erik Acharius. Jack Laundon assigned Lepraria incana as the type species of the genus in 1992. It is in the family Stereocaulaceae.

Species

Lepraria achariana  – South America
Lepraria alba 
Lepraria albicans 
Lepraria alpina 
Lepraria alternata  – Australia
Lepraria arbuscula 
Lepraria atlantica 
Lepraria atrotomentosa 
Lepraria aurescens  – Thailand
Lepraria barbatica 
Lepraria bergensis 
Lepraria borealis 
Lepraria brasiliensis 
Lepraria brodoi  – North America
Lepraria cacuminum 
Lepraria caesiella 
Lepraria caesioalba 
Lepraria celata 
Lepraria chileana  – Chile
Lepraria congesta 
Lepraria crassissima 
Lepraria cryophila 
Lepraria cryptovouauxii 
Lepraria cupressicola 
Lepraria dibenzofuranica  – Australia
Lepraria diffusa 
Lepraria disjuncta 
Lepraria ecorticata 
Lepraria elobata 
Lepraria friabilis 
Lepraria gelida 
Lepraria glaucosorediata 
Lepraria goughensis 
Lepraria gracilescens 
Lepraria granulata  – Eastern and Central Europe
Lepraria granulosa 
Lepraria harrisiana 
Lepraria hodkinsoniana 
Lepraria humida 
Lepraria impossibilis 
Lepraria incana 
Lepraria indica  – India
Lepraria isidiata 
Lepraria jackii 
Lepraria juanfernandezii 
Lepraria lanata 
Lepraria larrainiana  – Chile
Lepraria lecanorica 
Lepraria lendemeri 
Lepraria leuckertiana 
Lepraria lobata  – Australia
Lepraria lobificans 
Lepraria maderensis 
Lepraria malouina  – Falkland Islands
Lepraria membranacea 
Lepraria methylbarbatica 
Lepraria multiacida 
Lepraria neojackii 
Lepraria neozelandica  – New Zealand
Lepraria nigrocincta 
Lepraria nivalis 
Lepraria normandinoides 
Lepraria nothofagi 
Lepraria nylanderiana 
Lepraria ohmiensis 
Lepraria oxybapha 
Lepraria pacifica 
Lepraria pallida 
Lepraria pseudoarbuscula 
Lepraria pulchra 
Lepraria rigidula 
Lepraria salazinica 
Lepraria santosii 
Lepraria sekikaica 
Lepraria sipmaniana 
Lepraria squamatica 
Lepraria stephaniana 
Lepraria subalbicans 
Lepraria sulphurella 
Lepraria svalbardensis 
Lepraria sylvicola 
Lepraria tenella 
Lepraria toilenae 
Lepraria torii 
Lepraria umbricola 
Lepraria ulrikii  – Australasia
Lepraria vouauxii 
Lepraria xanthonica 
Lepraria xerophila 
Lepraria zeorinica

References

 
Lichen genera
Lecanorales genera
Taxa named by Erik Acharius
Taxa described in 1803